Gdański (femine: Gdańska, plural: Gdańscy) is a Polish-language toponymic literally meaning "of/from Gdańsk". It may refer to:

Places

Pomerania, Poland
 Gdańsk County
 Uniwersytet Gdański, a public research university located in Gdańsk, Poland
 Nowy Dwór Gdański, a town in the Żuławy Wiślane
 Pruszcz Gdański, a town in Pomerania
 Starogard Gdański, a town in Pomerania

Warsaw, Poland
 Gdański Bridge, a bridge across the Vistula in Warsaw, Poland
 Warszawa Gdańska station, Dworzec Gdański, a railway station in northern Warsaw, Poland
 Dworzec Gdański metro station, a station on Line M1 of the Warsaw Metro

Bydgoszcz, Poland
 Gdańska Street in Bydgoszcz

People 
 Carlos Gdansky Orgambide (born 1930), Argentine film director and screenwriter
 Jacek Gdański (born 1970), Polish chess player
  (1929-2003), Argentine writer
 Mściwój I Gdański, (c. 1160–1219 or 1220), Prince of Pomerelia
 Sambor I Gdański, (c. 1150–c. 1207), regent of Pomerelia

Other uses
 Mendel Gdański, a fictional character from short story by Maria Konopnicka

See also 
 
 Danziger (disambiguation)